Zomilla Hegyi (born 31 October 1989 in Budapest) is a Hungarian-Spanish sprint canoeist who has competed since the late 2000s. She won two silver medals in the K-1 4 x 200 m event at the ICF Canoe Sprint World Championships, earning them in 2009 and 2010.

References

External links
Canoe09.ca profile
NBC 2008 Olympics profile 

1989 births
Hungarian female canoeists
Spanish female canoeists
Living people
Canoeists from Budapest
ICF Canoe Sprint World Championships medalists in kayak